Stockheughter Covered Bridge, also known as Enochsburg Covered Bridge and County Bridge number 73, is a historic Howe Truss covered bridge located in Ray Township, Franklin County, Indiana.  The bridge was built in 1891, and measures 101 feet, 10 inches, long, 13 feet high, and 13 feet wide.  It has a gable roof and the exterior is clad in board and natten siding.

It was listed on the National Register of Historic Places in 2002.

References

Covered bridges on the National Register of Historic Places in Indiana
Bridges completed in 1891
Transportation buildings and structures in Franklin County, Indiana
National Register of Historic Places in Franklin County, Indiana
Road bridges on the National Register of Historic Places in Indiana
Wooden bridges in Indiana
Howe truss bridges in the United States